The Governor of Kemerovo Oblast is the head of government of Kemerovo Oblast, a federal subject of Russia.

The position was introduced in 1991 as Head of Administration of Kemerovo Oblast and was officially renamed on 23 June 1997. The Governor is elected by direct popular vote for a term of five years.

List of officeholders

References 

Politics of Kemerovo Oblast
 
Kemerovo